"Stairway to Heaven" is a song written by Neil Sedaka and Howard Greenfield. It was released as a 45 rpm single and appeared on Sedaka's 1960 album Neil Sedaka Sings Little Devil and His Other Hits.

Sedaka's "Stairway to Heaven" predates by 11 years Led Zeppelin's song of the same name, which was released in 1971 and written by Jimmy Page and Robert Plant. Sedaka remarked in 2021: "You can't copyright a title, so Led Zeppelin, I forgive you!"

Composition
Sedaka described the song as a "sandwich song:" the main verses and chorus, the "meat" of the song, are enveloped in a "bread," a short musical snippet repeated at the beginning and end of the song (in this case, the phrase "Climb up, way up high"). The style would become a trademark of Sedaka and Greenfield's compositions of the early 1960s.

Personnel
The personnel includes King Curtis on saxophone, Don Arnone, Art Ryerson and Everett Barksdale on guitar, Milt Hinton on bass, Irving Faberman on timpani and Dave "Panama" Francis on drums.

Reception
"Stairway to Heaven" became a hit for Sedaka after "Oh! Carol" (1958). In 1960, it repeated the performance of the previous single by peaking at number nine on the US Billboard Hot 100 chart.

Chart performance

References

External links

1960 singles
Neil Sedaka songs
Songs written by Neil Sedaka
Songs with lyrics by Howard Greenfield
1960 songs
RCA Victor singles